Langendorf is a municipality in the district Lüchow-Dannenberg, in Lower Saxony, Germany.

History 
On July 1, 1972, the municipalities of Kaltenhof and Laase were integrated

References

Lüchow-Dannenberg